{{Infobox Boxingmatch
| fight date   = 4 June 2005
| Fight Name   = Kostya Tszyu vs. Ricky Hatton
| image        = 
| location     = Manchester Evening News Arena, Manchester, UK
| fighter1     = Kostya Tszyu
| nickname1    = Thunder From Down Under
| record1      = 31-1 (25 KO)
| hometown1    = Serov, Russia (former Soviet Union)
| weight1      = 140 lb
| style1       = Orthodox
| height1      = 5 ft 7 in
| recognition1 = IBF and The Ring junior welterweight champion[[The Ring (magazine)|The Ring]] No. 3 ranked pound-for-pound fighter
| fighter2     = Ricky Hatton
| nickname2    = The Hitman
| record2      = 38-0 (28 KO)
| hometown2    = Manchester, UK
| weight2      = 139+3/4 lb
| style2       = Orthodox
| height2      = 5 ft 6 in
| recognition2 = WBU junior welterweight champion
| titles       = IBF and The Ring junior welterweight titles
| result       =  Hatton wins via 11th-round RTD
}}

Kostya Tszyu vs. Ricky Hatton, was a professional boxing match contested on 4 June 2005 for the IBF and The Ring junior welterweight championships. The 22,000 who attendanced the bout at the Manchester Arena witnessed one of the biggest upsets in British Boxing History.

 Build-up 
Kostya Tszyu was an established force amongst the top pound-for-pound fighters in the world and had been the first man to unify the light welterweight division in 30 years. At 35 years old he had been the champion for more than a decade and was considered a national hero in Australia. His only other defeat was in 1997 to Vince Phillips and was named the Ring Magazine upset of the year''.

Ricky Hatton at the time, held the minor WBU light welterweight belt, having knocked out Tony Pep and was coming into the fight off stoppage wins against Michael Stewart and Ray Oliveira. He was the underdog  for the fight known mostly in Britain as a young crowd favourite.

The fight was staged at 11pm local time to accommodate the American TV company Showtime and that it would on prime time in America. The referee was Dave Parris.

The Fight 
Tszyu was a notoriously slow starter and Hatton won the first two rounds in an aggressive start to the fight, however the champion qualities of Tszyu shone through in rounds 3–5 as he settled into a rhythm and was able to time his counter punches. The sportsmanship of both competitors was questionable at times throughout the middle phases of the fight; Tszyu knocking Hatton to the canvas in the closing stages of the seventh with what was found to be an illegal low blow, and Hatton responding with a deliberate low blow after Tszyu was warned again in the ninth. Nevertherless, Hatton's aggression and pace had begun to slow the aging champion, and going into the twelfth he had a slight lead on all three judges scorecards (105-104, 106-103 and 107-102). After a back and forth battle in which both fighters took great punishment, Tszyu failed to emerge from his corner for the final round as his trainer Johnny Lewis threw in the towel.

Despite parts of the fight being somewhat marred by illegal tactics from both sides, each fighter praised the other in post fight speeches; Hatton stating that he would be honoured to ever be a champion of the same ilk as Tszyu, and Tszyu humbly declaring that he was beaten by the better fighter.
This performance is generally regarded as the peak in Hatton's career; due to the stamina and heart he displayed in the fight.

Aftermath 
Kostya Tszyu retired after an illustrious career and is still loved in Sydney to this day.

This fight formed one of two fights, the other being against Carlos Maussa that brought Hatton the award of 2005 Ring Magazine fighter of the year. Hatton went on to beat such names Juan Urango, José Luis Castillo and Paulie Malignaggi but his time as a top class boxer came to an end after he lost to both pound-for-pound kings Floyd Mayweather Jr., in December 2007, and against Manny Pacquiao in May 2009 via a 2nd round KO. In the latter years of Hatton's career his level of fitness became questionable after he developed a pattern of ballooning up in weight between fights.

In their March 2010 issue, Ring Magazine ranked Tszyu as the number one junior welterweight of the decade (2000's) ahead of Hatton who was listed at number two.

Undercard 
Confirmed bouts:

Broadcasting

References 

Boxing matches
2005 in boxing
Boxing on Showtime
Boxing in England
Sports competitions in Manchester
2005 in English sport
2000s in Manchester
June 2005 sports events in the United Kingdom